Mr. William Shakespeare's Comedies, Histories, & Tragedies is a collection of plays by William Shakespeare, commonly referred to by modern scholars as the First Folio, published in 1623, about seven years after Shakespeare's death. It is considered one of the most influential books ever published.

Printed in folio format and containing 36 plays (see list of Shakespeare's plays), it was prepared by Shakespeare's colleagues John Heminges and Henry Condell. It was dedicated to the "incomparable pair of brethren" William Herbert, 3rd Earl of Pembroke and his brother Philip Herbert, Earl of Montgomery (later 4th Earl of Pembroke).

Although 19 of Shakespeare's plays had been published in quarto before 1623, the First Folio is arguably the only reliable text for about 20 of the plays, and a valuable source text for many of those previously published. Eighteen of the plays in the First Folio, including The Tempest, Twelfth Night, and Measure for Measure among others, are not known to have been previously printed. The Folio includes all of the plays generally accepted to be Shakespeare's, with the exception of Pericles, Prince of Tyre, The Two Noble Kinsmen, Edward III, and the two lost plays, Cardenio and Love's Labour's Won.

Out of perhaps 750 copies printed, 235 are known to remain, most of which are kept in either public archives or private collections. More than one third of the extant copies are housed at the Folger Shakespeare Library in Washington, D.C., which is home to a total of 82 First Folios.

Background

After a long career as an actor, dramatist, and sharer in the Lord Chamberlain's Men (later the King's Men) from  until , William Shakespeare died in Stratford-upon-Avon, on 23 April 1616, and was buried in the chancel of the Church of the Holy Trinity two days later. 

Shakespeare's works—both poetic and dramatic—had a rich history in print before the publication of the First Folio: from the first publications of Venus and Adonis (1593) and The Rape of Lucrece (1594), 78 individual printed editions of his works are known. Of these, 23 are his poetry and the remaining 55 his plays. Counting by number of editions published before 1623, the best-selling works were Venus and Adonis (12 editions), The Rape of Lucrece (6 editions), and Henry IV, Part 1 (6 editions). Of the 23 editions of the poems, 16 were published in octavo; the rest, and almost all of the editions of the plays, were printed in quarto. The quarto format was made by folding a large sheet of printing paper twice, forming 4 leaves with 8 pages. The average quarto measured  and was typically made up of 9 sheets, giving 72 total pages. Octavos—made by folding a sheet of the same size three times, forming 8 leaves with 16 pages—were about half as large as a quarto. Since the cost of paper represented about 50-75% of a book's total production costs, octavos were generally cheaper to manufacture than quartos, and a common way to reduce publishing costs was to reduce the number of pages needed by compressing (using two columns or a smaller typeface) or abbreviating the text.

Editions of individual plays were typically published in quarto and could be bought for 6d without a binding. These editions were primarily intended to be cheap and convenient, and read until worn out or repurposed as wrapping paper (or worse), rather than high quality objects kept in a library. Customers who wanted to keep a particular play would have to have it bound, and would typically bind several related or miscellany plays into one volume. Octavos, though nominally cheaper to produce, were somewhat different. From  (Venus and Adonis) and 1598 (The Rape of Lucrece), Shakespeare's narrative poems were published in octavo. In The Cambridge Companion to Shakespeare's First Folio, Tara L. Lyons argues that this was partly due to the publisher, John Harrison's, desire to capitalize on the poems' association with Ovid: the Greek classics were sold in octavo, so printing Shakespeare's poetry in the same format would strengthen the association. The octavo generally carried greater prestige, so the format itself would help to elevate their standing. Ultimately, however, the choice was a financial one: Venus and Adonis in octavo needed four sheets of paper, versus seven in quarto, and the octavo The Rape of Lucrece needed five sheets, versus 12 in quarto. Whatever the motivation, the move seems to have had the intended effect: Francis Meres, the first known literary critic to comment on Shakespeare, in his Palladis Tamia (1598), puts it thus: "the sweete wittie soule of Ouid liues in mellifluous & hony-tongued Shakespeare, witnes his Venus and Adonis, his Lucrece, his sugred Sonnets among his priuate friends".

Publishing literary works in folio was not unprecedented. Starting with the publication of Sir Philip Sidney's The Countess of Pembroke's Arcadia (1593) and Astrophel and Stella (1598), both published by William Ponsonby, there was a significant number of folios published, and a significant number of them were published by the men who would later be involved in publishing the First Folio. But quarto was the typical format for plays printed in the period: folio was a prestige format, typically used, according to Fredson Bowers, for books of "superior merit or some permanent value".

Printing
The contents of the First Folio were compiled by John Heminges and Henry Condell; the members of the Stationers Company who published the book were the booksellers Edward Blount and the father/son team of William and Isaac Jaggard. William Jaggard has seemed an odd choice by the King's Men because he had published the questionable collection The Passionate Pilgrim as Shakespeare's, and in 1619 had printed new editions of 10 Shakespearean quartos to which he did not have clear rights, some with false dates and title pages (the False Folio affair). Indeed, his contemporary Thomas Heywood, whose poetry Jaggard had pirated and misattributed to Shakespeare, specifically reports that Shakespeare was "much offended with M. Jaggard (that altogether unknown to him) presumed to make so bold with his name."

Heminges and Condell emphasised that the Folio was replacing the earlier publications, which they characterised as "stol'n and surreptitious copies, maimed and deformed by frauds and stealths of injurious impostors", asserting that Shakespeare's true words "are now offer'd to your view cured, and perfect of their limbes; and all the rest, absolute in their numbers as he conceived them."

The paper industry in England was then in its infancy and the quantity of quality rag paper for the book was imported from France. It is thought that the typesetting and printing of the First Folio was such a large job that the King's Men simply needed the capacities of the Jaggards' shop. William Jaggard was old, infirm and blind by 1623, and died a month before the book went on sale; most of the work in the project must have been done by his son Isaac.

The First Folio's publishing syndicate also included two stationers who owned the rights to some of the individual plays that had been previously printed: William Aspley (Much Ado About Nothing and Henry IV, Part 2) and John Smethwick (Love's Labour's Lost, Romeo and Juliet, and Hamlet). Smethwick had been a business partner of another Jaggard, William's brother John.

The printing of the Folio was probably done between February 1622 and early November 1623. It is possible that the printer originally expected to have the book ready early, since it was listed in the Frankfurt Book Fair catalogue as a book to appear between April and October 1622, but the catalogue contained many books not yet printed by 1622, and the modern consensus is that the entry was simply intended as advance publicity. The first impression had a publication date of 1623, and the earliest record of a retail purchase is an account book entry for 5 December 1623 of Edward Dering (who purchased two); the Bodleian Library, in Oxford, received its copy in early 1624 (which it subsequently sold for £24 as a superseded edition when the Third Folio became available in 1663/1664).

Contents
The 36 plays of the First Folio occur in the order given below; plays that had never been published before 1623 are marked with an asterisk. Each play is followed by the type of source used, as determined by bibliographical research.

The term foul papers refers to Shakespeare's working drafts of a play. When completed, a transcript or fair copy of the foul papers would be prepared, by the author or by a scribe. Such a manuscript would have to be heavily annotated with accurate and detailed stage directions and all the other data needed for performance, and then could serve as a prompt book, to be used by the prompter to guide a performance of the play. Any of these manuscripts, in any combination, could be used as a source for a printed text. The label Qn denotes the nth quarto edition of a play.

Comedies
 1 The Tempest * – the play was set into type from a manuscript prepared by Ralph Crane, a professional scrivener employed by the King's Men. Crane produced a high-quality result, with formal act/scene divisions, frequent use of parentheses and hyphenated forms, and other identifiable features.
 2 The Two Gentlemen of Verona * – another transcript by Ralph Crane.
 3 The Merry Wives of Windsor – another transcript by Ralph Crane.
 4 Measure for Measure * – probably another Ralph Crane transcript.
 5 The Comedy of Errors * – probably typeset from Shakespeare's "foul papers," lightly annotated.
 6 Much Ado About Nothing – typeset from a copy of the quarto, lightly annotated.
 7 Love's Labour's Lost – typeset from a corrected copy of Q1.
 8 A Midsummer Night's Dream – typeset from a copy of Q2, well-annotated, possibly used as a prompt-book.
 9 The Merchant of Venice – typeset from a lightly edited and corrected copy of Q1.
 10 As You Like It * – from a quality manuscript, lightly annotated by a prompter.
 11 The Taming of the Shrew * – typeset from Shakespeare's "foul papers," somewhat annotated, perhaps as preparation for use as a prompt-book.
 12 All's Well That Ends Well * – probably from Shakespeare's "foul papers" or a manuscript of them.
 13 Twelfth Night * – typeset either from a prompt-book or a transcript of one.
 14 The Winter's Tale * – another transcript by Ralph Crane.
Histories
 15 King John * – uncertain: a prompt-book, or "foul papers."
 16 Richard II – typeset from Q3 and Q5, corrected against a prompt-book.
 17 Henry IV, Part 1 – typeset from an edited copy of Q5.
 18 Henry IV, Part 2 – uncertain: some combination of manuscript and quarto text.
 19 Henry V – typeset from Shakespeare's "foul papers."
 20 Henry VI, Part 1 * – likely from an annotated transcript of the author's manuscript.
 21 Henry VI, Part 2 – probably a Shakespearean manuscript used as a prompt-book.
 22 Henry VI, Part 3 – like 2H6, probably a Shakespearean prompt-book.
 23 Richard III – a difficult case: probably typeset partially from Q3, and partially from Q6 corrected against a manuscript (maybe "foul papers").
 24 Henry VIII * – typeset from a fair copy of the authors' manuscript.
Tragedies
 25 Troilus and Cressida – probably typeset from the quarto, corrected with Shakespeare's "foul papers," printed after the rest of the Folio was completed.
 26 Coriolanus * – set from a high-quality authorial transcript.
 27 Titus Andronicus – typeset from a copy of Q3 that might have served as a prompt-book.
 28 Romeo and Juliet – in essence a reprint of Q3.
 29 Timon of Athens * – set from Shakespeare's foul papers or a transcript of them.
 30 Julius Caesar * – set from a prompt-book, or a transcript of a prompt-book.
 31 Macbeth * – probably set from a prompt-book, perhaps detailing an adaptation of the play for a short indoor performance
 32 Hamlet – one of the most difficult problems in the First Folio: probably typeset from some combination of Q2 and manuscript sources.
 33 King Lear – a difficult problem: probably set mainly from Q1 but with reference to Q2, and corrected against a prompt-book.
 34 Othello – another difficult problem: probably typeset from Q1, corrected with a quality manuscript.
 35 Antony and Cleopatra * – possibly "foul papers" or a transcript of them.
 36 Cymbeline * – possibly another Ralph Crane transcript, or else the official prompt-book.

Troilus and Cressida was originally intended to follow Romeo and Juliet, but the typesetting was stopped, probably due to a conflict over the rights to the play; it was later inserted as the first of the tragedies, when the rights question was resolved. It does not appear in the table of contents.

Introductory poem
Ben Jonson wrote a preface to the folio with this poem addressed "To the Reader" facing the Droeshout portrait engraving:

Compositors
As far as modern scholarship has been able to determine, the First Folio texts were set into type by five compositors, with different spelling habits, peculiarities, and levels of competence. Researchers have labelled them A through E, A being the most accurate, and E an apprentice who had significant difficulties in dealing with manuscript copy. Their shares in typesetting the pages of the Folio break down like this:

Compositor "E" was most likely one John Leason, whose apprenticeship contract dated only from 4 November 1622. One of the other four might have been a John Shakespeare, of Warwickshire, who apprenticed with Jaggard in 1610–17. ("Shakespeare" was a common name in Warwickshire in that era; John was no known relation to the playwright.)

The First Folio and variants 

W. W. Greg has argued that Edward Knight, the "book-keeper" or "book-holder" (prompter) of the King's Men, did the actual proofreading of the manuscript sources for the First Folio. Knight is known to have been responsible for maintaining and annotating the company's scripts, and making sure that the company complied with cuts and changes ordered by the Master of the Revels.

Some pages of the First Folio – 134 out of the total of 900 – were proofread and corrected while the job of printing the book was ongoing. As a result, the Folio differs from modern books in that individual copies vary considerably in their typographical errors. There were about 500 corrections made to the Folio in this way. These corrections by the typesetters, however, consisted only of simple typos, clear mistakes in their own work; the evidence suggests that they almost never referred back to their manuscript sources, let alone tried to resolve any problems in those sources. The well-known cruxes in the First Folio texts were beyond the typesetters' capacity to correct.

The Folio was typeset and bound in "sixes" – 3 sheets of paper, taken together, were folded into a booklet-like quire or gathering of 6 leaves, 12 pages. Once printed, the "sixes" were assembled and bound together to make the book. The sheets were printed in 2-page formes, meaning that pages 1 and 12 of the first quire were printed simultaneously on one side of one sheet of paper (which became the "outer" side); then pages 2 and 11 were printed on the other side of the same sheet (the "inner" side). The same was done with pages 3 and 10, and 4 and 9, on the second sheet, and pages 5 and 8, and 6 and 7, on the third. Then the first quire could be assembled with its pages in the correct order. The next quire was printed by the same method: pages 13 and 24 on one side of one sheet, etc. This meant that the text being printed had to be "cast off" – the compositors had to plan beforehand how much text would fit onto each page. If the compositors were setting type from manuscripts (perhaps messy, revised and corrected manuscripts), their calculations would frequently be off by greater or lesser amounts, resulting in the need to expand or compress. A line of verse could be printed as two; or verse could be printed as prose to save space, or lines and passages could even be omitted (a disturbing prospect for those who prize Shakespeare's works).

Holdings, sales and valuations

Jean-Christophe Mayer, in The Cambridge Companion to Shakespeare's First Folio (2016), estimates the original retail price of the First Folio to be about 15s for an unbound copy, and up to £1 for one bound in calfskin. In terms of purchasing power, "a bound folio would be about forty times the price of a single play and represented almost two months’ wages for an ordinary skilled worker."

It is believed that around 750 copies of the First Folio were printed, of which there are 235 known surviving copies.

Holdings 
The world's largest collection is in the possession of the Folger Shakespeare Library (82 copies) in Washington, D.C., followed by Meisei University (12) in Tokyo, the New York Public Library (6) in New York City, and the British Library (5) in London. The Folger collection alone accounts for more than one third of all known surviving copies. Together, the nine largest First Folio collections comprise more than half of all known extant copies. 

Thirty-one American colleges and universities own a total of thirty-eight copies of the First Folio, while seven British universities own fourteen copies. Universities in possession of multiple copies include the University of Cambridge (4), the University of Oxford (4), the University of Texas at Austin (3), Princeton University (3), Brown University (2), Harvard University (2), the University of London (2), and Yale University (2). Three are also in possession of the University of California system, with one each at UC Berkeley, UCLA, and UC Irvine. In Canada, the University of Toronto's Thomas Fisher Rare Book Library owns one copy and the University of British Columbia another.

A number of copies are held by public libraries. In the United States, the New York Public Library owns six copies. The Boston Public Library, Free Library of Philadelphia, Dallas Public Library, and Buffalo & Erie County Public Library each hold one copy. In the UK, The Library of Birmingham owns one copy.

Additional copies are owned by the Huntington Library (4), The Shakespeare Centre (3), the Victoria and Albert Museum (3), Sutro Library (2), the Morgan Library and Museum (2), Newberry Library, Fondation Martin Bodmer, the State Library of New South Wales, Indian Institute of Technology Roorkee, and the National Library of Chile, in Santiago.

Sales and valuations 
The First Folio is one of the most valuable printed books in the world: a copy sold at Christie's in New York in October 2001 made $6.16 million hammer price (then £3.73m). In October 2020, a copy sold by Mills College at Christie's fetched a price of $10 million, making it the most expensive work of literature ever auctioned.

Oriel College, Oxford, raised a conjectured £3.5 million from the sale of its First Folio to Sir Paul Getty in 2003.

To commemorate the 400th anniversary of Shakespeare's death in 2016, the Folger Shakespeare Library toured some of its 82 First Folios for display in all 50 U.S. states, Washington, D.C. and Puerto Rico.

Discoveries of previously unknown Folios
On 13 July 2006, a complete copy of the First Folio owned by Dr Williams's Library was auctioned at Sotheby's auction house. The book, which was in its original 17th-century binding, sold for £2,808,000, less than Sotheby's top estimate of £3.5 million. This copy is one of only about 40 remaining complete copies (most of the existing copies are incomplete); only one other copy of the book remains in private ownership.

On 11 July 2008, it was reported that a copy stolen from Durham University, England, in 1998 had been recovered after being submitted for valuation at the Folger Shakespeare Library. News reports estimated the folio's value at anywhere from £250,000 in total for the First Folio and all the other books and manuscripts stolen (BBC News, 1998), up to $30 million (The New York Times, 2008). Although the book, once the property of John Cosin the Bishop of Durham, was returned to the library, it had been mutilated and was missing its cover and title page. The folio was returned to public display on 19 June 2010 after its twelve-year absence. Fifty-three-year-old Raymond Scott received an eight-year prison sentence for handling stolen goods, but was acquitted of the theft itself. A July 2010 BBC programme about the affair, Stealing Shakespeare, portrayed Scott as a fantasist and petty thief. In 2013, Scott killed himself in his prison cell.

In November 2014, a previously unknown First Folio was found in a public library in Saint-Omer, Pas-de-Calais in France, where it had lain for 200 years. Confirmation of its authenticity came from Eric Rasmussen of the University of Nevada, Reno, one of the world's foremost authorities on Shakespeare. The title page and introductory material are missing. The name "Neville", written on the first surviving page, may indicate that it once belonged to Edward Scarisbrick, who fled England due to anti-Catholic repression, attended the Jesuit Saint-Omer College, and was known to use that alias. 

In March 2016, Christie's announced that a previously unrecorded copy once owned by 19th-century collector Sir George Augustus Shuckburgh-Evelyn would be auctioned on 25 May 2016. According to the Antiques Trade Gazette, an American collector paid £1,600,000 for it; the buyer also successfully bid on copies of the second, third, and fourth folios.

In April 2016 another new discovery was announced, a First Folio having been found in Mount Stuart House on the Isle of Bute, Scotland. It was authenticated by Professor Emma Smith of Oxford University. The Folio originally belonged to Isaac Reed.

See also
 Books in the United Kingdom
 List of most expensive books and manuscripts

Notes

References

Bibliography

Further reading

External links

General resources
 Jonathan Bate: The Case for the Folio
 Project Gutenberg Shakespeare's First Folio
 Project Gutenberg The Complete Works of William Shakespeare

Digital facsimiles
 West 31The Bodleian Library's First Folio
 West 150The Boston Public Library's First Folio, digitized by the Internet Archive
 First Folio on Unotate Folio
 The Internet Shakespeare Editions
 West 153Brandeis University's First Folio, digitized for the Internet Shakespeare Editions project
 West 192The State Library of New South Wales's First Folio, digitized for the Internet Shakespeare Editions project
 West 6The University of Cambridge's First Folio
 Folger Shakespeare Library
 West 63Folger Folio no. 5
 West 65Folger Folio no. 7
 West 67Folger Folio no. 9
 West 126Folger Folio no. 68
 West 77Folger Folio no. 19
 West 80Folger Folio no. 22
 West 91Folger Folio no. 33
 West 96Folger Folio no. 38
 West 101Folger Folio no. 43
 West 216The Bodmer Library's First Folio
 West 185The Harry Ransom Center's First Folio
 West 12The Brotherton Library's First Folio
 West 201Meisei University's First Folio
 West 174Miami University's First Folio
 West 192The State Library of New South Wales's First Folio
 West 180The Furness Library's First Folio
 West 198 - The Biblioteca Universitaria di Padova 's First Folio
 UnnumberedThe Bibliothèque d’agglomération de Saint-Omer's First Folio (discovered in 2016, after the West census)
 West 197The Württembergische Landesbibliothek's First Folio

1623 books
1623 in England
Bibliography
Bodleian Library collection
Early editions of Shakespeare
Books of plays